Philip Moriarty (born 1968 in London) is an Irish physicist and professor of physics at the University of Nottingham. He is known for his work on nanostructures and his collaboration with Brady Haran on the YouTube video series Sixty Symbols.

Education and career
From 1990 to 1994, Moriarty attended the School of Physical Sciences of Dublin City University, where he received his doctorate in 1994 in physics. Until 1997, he was as a postdoctoral student in the field of physics at the University of Nottingham. He became a lecturer in the Department of Physics until 2003. Since 2005 he has been Professor of Physics at the School of Physics and Astronomy, University of Nottingham.

Moriarty is one of the collaborating members of the Sixty Symbols Internet video series. Brady Haran asks scientists about a physics symbol (e.g. Ψ) in each episode, and then he and the community of Sixty Symbols discuss it and a related topic. In 2016 Haran, Michael Merrifeld and Moriarty were awarded the Kelvin Medal and Prize by the Institute of Physics. The citation was "for innovative and effective promotion of the public understanding of physics through the Sixty Symbols video project."

Moriarty is the author of When the Uncertainty Principle Goes to 11: Or How to Explain Quantum Physics with Heavy Metal. This book was shortlisted for Physics World’s Book Of The Year 2018.

Selected papers

References

External links
 Faculty website
 Personal Blog
 https://www.independent.co.uk/news/education/higher/against-the-grain-i-didn-t-become-a-scientist-to-help-companies-profit-788328.html

20th-century British physicists
21st-century British physicists
1968 births
British expatriates in Ireland
Living people
Alumni of Dublin City University
Alumni of the University of Nottingham
Scientists from London
Irish physicists